Eduardo Praes (born 3 November 1988) is a former Brazilian professional footballer who played as a centre back.

Club career
In June 2017, Praes was released by Pegasus and later signed with Tai Po.  On 13 May 2018, Tai Po manager, Lee Chi Kin confirmed that Eduardo would remain with the club next season.

On 17 July 2019, Praes was signed by Eastern, with a contract until 30 June 2021.

On 31 May 2022, Praes left the club after finishing his contract.

On 12 July 2022, Praes joined Kitchee. He left the club 13 days later due to family reasons.

On 2 August 2022, Praes announced his retirement from professional football.

Honours

Club
Eastern
 Hong Kong Senior Shield: 2019–20
 Hong Kong FA Cup: 2019–20
Hong Kong Sapling Cup: 2020–21

Tai Po
 Hong Kong Premier League: 2018–19

Pegasus
 Hong Kong FA Cup: 2015–16
Hong Kong Sapling Cup: 2015–16

Career statistics

Club

As of 20 May 2021

References

External links
 
 Eduardo Praes at HKFA
 

1988 births
Living people
Brazilian footballers
Mogi Mirim Esporte Clube players
Associação Atlética Coruripe players
Red Bull Brasil players
Paulista Futebol Clube players
Nacional Futebol Clube players
Esporte Clube Taubaté players
Esporte Clube Pelotas players
Real Estelí F.C. players
TSW Pegasus FC players
Tai Po FC players
Eastern Sports Club footballers
Kitchee SC players
Hong Kong Premier League players
Expatriate footballers in Nicaragua
Brazilian expatriate sportspeople in Hong Kong
Expatriate footballers in Hong Kong
Association football defenders
Hong Kong League XI representative players